Záhony is a town in Szabolcs-Szatmár-Bereg county, Northern Great Plain, eastern Hungary.

It is near the Ukrainian border (at Chop and Solomonovo) and was part of Ung county before the Treaty of Trianon. Road and railway border crossings into Ukraine are located here. The Ukrainian town across the border is Chop.

International relations

Twin towns – Sister cities
Záhony is twinned with:

  Chop, Ukraine 
  Čierna, Slovakia
 Ware, Hertfordshire, England

Gallery

References

Populated places in Szabolcs-Szatmár-Bereg County
Hungary–Ukraine border crossings